Anna Ternheim (born 31 May 1978) is a Swedish singer-songwriter.

Early life
Ternheim was born 31 May 1978 in Stockholm, Sweden. When she was 10 years old she began playing the guitar, writing songs and performing. During a year abroad in Atlanta, Georgia, Anna created her first band "Sova", playing at smaller festivals and local clubs. Back in Stockholm she continued her song writing and later in Lausanne, Switzerland, where she was performing while studying French.

Career
She released her debut album Somebody Outside in 2004. The Swedish Grammy jury awarded her the Best Newcomer of the Year award, and she was nominated for Best Female Artist, Best Lyricist and Best Songwriter in 2005. She also won the P3 Gold award for Best Newcomer 2004.

For her second album, Separation Road released on 27 September 2006, she was awarded Best Female Artist and Best Lyricist by the Swedish Grammy jury.  Again she was nominated for Best Songwriter and Best Album. She received the award for Best Female Artist at the Swedish National Radio's P3 Gold Awards the same year.

Her debut US album, Halfway to Fivepoints, was released on 22 April 2008.

In 2008, Ternheim moved to Manhattan, where she has lived ever since.

Her fourth album, Leaving on a Mayday, was released on 11 August 2008. The album won Album of the Year at the 2009 Swedish Grammy Awards along with the award for Best Female Artist.

The Night Visitor, Ternheim's fifth studio album, was released in autumn 2011 in both the United States and international territories. 

After a series of performances and a brief break from touring, Ternheim announced on her blog in April 2015 recording sessions for a new album or EP, based from the Figure 8 Recording studio in Brooklyn, New York.

Discography

Her most popular songs include: "To Be Gone", "My Secret", "Girl Laying Down", "Today is A Good Day", and "Shoreline" (a Broder Daniel cover).

Albums
2004 – Somebody Outside
2006 – Separation Road
2008 – Halfway to Fivepoints (US only)
2008 – Leaving on a Mayday
2011 – The Night Visitor
2015 – For the Young
2017 – All the Way to Rio
2019 – A Space for Lost Time

Live albums
2016 – Live in Stockholm
2018 – The Winter Tapes

EPs
1996 – Sova
2003 – Anna Ternheim – demo
2004 – I'll Follow You Tonight
2004 – To Be Gone
2005 – My Secret
2005 – Shoreline
2006 – Girl Laying Down
2007 – Lovers Dream & More Music for Psychotic Lovers
2007 – Anna Ternheim
2008 – Halfway to Fivepoints (US only)
2012 – Anna & Ferg (with David Ferguson)
2006 – Gifts of Changes

Singles
2004 – "To Be Gone"
2005 – "My Secret"
2005 – "Shoreline"
2006 – "Girl Laying Down"
2007 – "Today Is a Good Day"
2008 – "What Have I Done"
2009 – "Escape Into My Arms"
2009 – "No, I don't Remember"
2009 – "Make It On My Own"
2012 – "Walking Aimlessly"
2012 – "Lorelie-Marie"
2013 – "Shoreline (Horns & Saw Version)"
2013 – "Light of Day"
2015 – "Every Heartbeat"
2015 – "Still A Beautiful Day"
2015 – "For The Young"
2015 – "Caroline"
2016 – "Kärleken Väntar"
2017 – "Minns Det Som Igår"

Guest appearances
2007 – Leave a Light on Voices of Eden by Fläskkvartetten
2007 – Reflexion 07 on Reflexion 07 by Petter
2009 – Du Och Jag and  Christmas on The Dark Flower (Den Mörka Blomman) by Freddie Wadling
2010 – Spår on Spår by Tomas Andersson Wij
2012 – Quiet Night on Wallander – The Music by Fleshquartet
2013 – Seventeen (Alternative Version) on Seventeen by Johnossi
2014 – Lovers Never Say Goodbye on The Time Has Come by Weeping Willows
2015 – Far From Any Road on Ghost Rider by Jerry Williams

Songs in popular culture

In 2010 her song "My Heart Still Beats for You" featured on season 7 of The CW's One Tree Hill.
Her song "What Have I Done" was featured on the popular drama series "Grey's Anatomy".

The Ternheim song "Quiet Night" was used in the second series of the Swedish version of Wallander starring Krister Henriksson. On 18 December 2009, her song "No, I Don't Remember" was featured on an episode of Dollhouse entitled "The Attic". This song was featured in July 2010 on a new DLC episode, for the Xbox 360 videogame Alan Wake, entitled "The Signal". The songs "Off the Road" and "Words of Love" also featured in the videogame Silent Hill: Downpour.

References

External links

 

1978 births
Living people
Swedish women singers
Musicians from Stockholm
Swedish singer-songwriters
Swedish women singer-songwriters
English-language singers from Sweden
21st-century Swedish singers
21st-century Swedish women singers